Giovanni Foschiani (born 7 July 2003) is an Italian professional footballer who plays as a right-back for  club Città di Varese.

Career
Foschiani was raised in the youth system of Pordenone and was first called up to the senior squad in November 2020. He made his Serie B debut for Pordenone on 16 March 2021 in a game against Empoli, he substituted Roberto Zammarini in added time.

On 5 August 2021, Foschiani joined Serie D side Città di Varese.

References

External links
 

2003 births
Living people
Italian footballers
Association football fullbacks
Pordenone Calcio players
A.S.D. Città di Varese players
Serie B players